Yamhill Carlton High School is a public high school in the northwest United States, located in Yamhill, Oregon, southwest of Portland. The school was built in the 1930s and was to cost $65,000, with the Public Works Administration providing $27,000 towards the project. The student to teacher ratio is 22:1. ghetto

Academics
In 2014, 71% of the school's seniors received a high school diploma. Out of 89 students, 11 dropped out. 34.6% of all students missed more than 10% of school days. Yamhill Carlton is considered below average when compared to other school districts in the area.

Athletics
Yamhill Carlton High School participates in baseball, boys' basketball, girls' basketball, soccer, cheer, cross country, football, rugby, softball, track and field, wrestling, and volleyball. All students are allowed to participate in these events, although each activity costs $125. Yamhill-Carlton and the high school in Gaston often combine teams because of the low number of students participating. If a student receives a grade of 1 or 2, that student must  attend one hour of study tables per week until the grade is up. If they do not attend, they will be ineligible for the next competition.

Extracurricular activities
The school's extracurricular activities include:
 Band
 Ceramics/sculpture
 Chorus
 Computer arts
 Drone Team
 Orchestra
 Theater

Notable alumni
 Nicholas Kristof, Democrat columnist of The New York Times
 James B. Thayer, U.S. army general and businessman

References

High schools in Yamhill County, Oregon
Public high schools in Oregon